WMGV (103.3 FM, "Magic 103.3/95.5") is an adult contemporary music formatted radio station licensed to serve Newport, North Carolina. The station serves Eastern North Carolina with a mix of music from the 1980s, 1990s and today.

History
WMGV has been on the air since the early 1980s. Over the years it has been known as "V103.3", "Classy 103.3, "Kat 103.3", and, back in the 1980s, "Z103".

In 1989, Henry Hinton started New East Communications of Greenville, North Carolina. The company's stations were WKQT, WCZI, and WGPM. WKQT was sold in 1996.

On February 2, 2017, Beasley Media Group announced that it would sell its six stations and four translators in the Greenville-New Bern-Jacksonville, North Carolina market, including WMGV, to Curtis Media Group for $11 million to reduce the company's debt. The sale was completed on May 1, 2017.

On October 24, 2022 the station reverted back to adult contemporary as "Magic 103.3/95.5", including the recent addition of a simulcast on translator 95.5 W238CF Jacksonville, with the station's previous iteration as hot adult contemporary effectively taken over by sister station WMJV, which had shifted to the format the previous week. No other changes are planned at this time, as the entire previous "V" airstaff retains their positions following the move, with the exception of adding Delilah in evenings.

Former logo

References

External links
WMGV official website
Curtis Media Stations

MGV
Mainstream adult contemporary radio stations in the United States
Radio stations established in 1980